Colonel Philip Meadows Taylor,  (25 September 1808 – 13 May 1876), an administrator in British India and a novelist, made notable contributions to public knowledge of South India. Though largely self-taught, he was a polymath, working alternately as a judge, engineer, artist, and man of letters.

Life and writings
Taylor was born in Liverpool, England, where his father, Philip Meadows Taylor, was a merchant. His mother was Jane Honoria Alicia, daughter of Bertram Mitford of Mitford Castle, Northumberland.

At the age of 15, Taylor was sent out to India to become a clerk to a Bombay merchant, Mr Baxter. However, Baxter was in financial difficulties, and in 1824 Taylor gladly accepted a commission in the service of the Nizam of Hyderabad, with which he remained dutifully attached throughout his long career. He was speedily transferred from military duty to a civil appointment, and in this capacity acquired a proficient knowledge of the languages and the people of southern India.

Meanwhile, Taylor studied the laws, geology and the antiquities of the country and became an early expert on megaliths. See more at South Asian Stone Age. He was alternately judge, engineer, artist, and a man of letters.

While on furlough in England in 1840, he published the first of his Indian novels, Confessions of a Thug, in which he reproduced the scenes which he had heard about the Thuggee cult, described by the chief actors in them. This book was followed by a series of tales, Tippoo Sultaun (1840), Tara (1863), Ralph Darnell (1865), Seeta (1872), and A Noble Queen (1878), all illustrating periods in Indian history and society and giving prominence to the native character, institutions and traditions, for which he had a great regard. Seeta in particular was remarkable for a sympathetic, romantic portrayal of the marriage between a British civil servant and a Hindu widow just before the Indian Mutiny. Taylor himself is thought to have married in about 1830, although his autobiography states 1840, to Mary Palmer, a Eurasian granddaughter of William Palmer, the East India Company's Resident at Hyderabad, who had married "one of the Princesses of the Royal House of Delhi". Returning to India he acted, from 1840 to 1853 as correspondent for The Times and wrote a Student's Manual of the History of India (1870).

About 1850, Meadows Taylor was appointed by the Nizam's government to administer during a long minority the principality of the young Raja Venkatappa Nayaka He succeeded without European assistance in raising this small territory to a high degree of prosperity. Such was his influence with the natives that during the Indian Mutiny in 1857, he held his ground without military support.

Colonel Taylor, whose merits were recognized and acknowledged by then by the British government of India – although he had never been in the service of the Company – was subsequently appointed Deputy Commissioner of the western "Ceded Districts". He succeeded in establishing a new assessment of revenues that was more equitable to cultivators and more productive to the government. By perseverance he had risen from the condition of a half-educated youth without patronage, and without even the support of the Company, to successful government of some of the most important provinces of India,  in extent with a population of over five million.

He received an Order of the Star of India on his retirement from service in 1860 and given a pension. In 1875 his sight failed, and on medical advice he decided to spend the winter in India, but contracted jungle fever. He died at Menton, France, on his way home, on 13 May 1876.

Contributions to Gulburga
Taylor made several contributions to the Gulburga region in India by initiating a number of reforms. He encouraged improvement of agriculture, opened up job opportunities, started schools and improved infrastructure. He was known to spend his own money on providing drought relief. The local people began calling him "Mahadev Baba". Taylor undertook notable archaeological excavations in Gulburga, publishing his findings in the Transactions of the Royal Irish Academy and the Journal of The Bombay Branch of the Royal Asiatic Society.

Tributes
Richard Garnett commented, "His Confessions of a Thug is a classic adventure novel, which inspired the young of several imperial generations and was much imitated by other colonial fiction writers for over a century."

Rich tributes were paid to Taylor, by the Archaeological Survey of India in its History of Indian Archaeology 1784–1947 by Sourindranath Roy. Taylor's archaeological work is acknowledged there as highly significant.

Bibliography

Novels
Confessions of a Thug (1839 2nd ed., London, 1873)
Tippoo Sultaun: The Tale of the Mysore War (1840)
Tara: A Maratha Tale (Edinburgh/London: 1863)
Ralph Darnell (1865)
Seeta (London: 1872)
A Noble Queen: A Romance of Indian History (London: 1878)

Non-fiction
The Megalithic Tombs and other Ancient Remains in the Deccan (reprint, Hyderabad, 1941)
The Student's Manual of the History of India (London, 1871)

Posthumous publications
The Story of My Life (London, 1877)
Tobacco – a Farmer's Crop (1886)
The Letters to Henry Reeve (1947)

Arms

References

External links

Philip Meadows Taylor. The story of my life, by M. Taylor. Ed. by his daughter (A.M. Taylor)]. Oxford University, 1882
Philip Meadows Taylor. [https://archive.org/details/confessionsofthu03tayl Confessions of a Thug. Oxford University Press, 1839
Philip Meadows Taylor. Tippoo Sultaun; a tale of the Mysore war C K Paul, 1880
David Finkelstein Philip Meadows Taylor – Victorian Fiction Research Guide

1808 births
1876 deaths
Novelists from Liverpool
British people in colonial India
Administrators in British India
Companions of the Order of the Star of India
People from Hyderabad State